The Treaty of Zuhab (Ahadnāmah Zuhab), also called Treaty of Qasr-e Shirin, was an accord signed between the Safavid Empire and the Ottoman Empire on May 17, 1639. The accord ended the Ottoman-Safavid War of 1623–1639 and was the last conflict in almost 150 years of intermittent wars between the two states over territorial disputes. It can roughly be seen as a confirmation of the previous Peace of Amasya from 1555.

The treaty confirmed the dividing of territories in West Asia priorly held by the Safavids, such as the permanent parting of the Caucasus between the two powers, in which East Armenia, eastern Georgia, Dagestan, and Azerbaijan stayed under the control of the Safavid Empire, while western Georgia and most of Western Armenia came fully under Ottoman rule. It also included all of Mesopotamia (including Baghdad) being irreversibly ceded to the Ottomans, as well as Safavid-controlled eastern Samtskhe (Meskheti), making Samtskhe in its entirety an Ottoman possession. With the Treaty of Zuhab, Eastern Armenia remained for more than eight decades under Safavid Rule, who separated it into two administrative regions: Erivan Province and Karabakh Province.

Nevertheless, border disputes between Persia and the Ottoman Empire did not end. Between 1555 and 1918, Persia and the Ottomans signed no less than 18 treaties that would re-address their disputed borders. The exact demarcation according to this treaty would permanently begin during the 19th century, essentially laying out the rough outline for the frontier between modern day Iran and the states of Turkey and Iraq, which was the Ottoman-Persian border until 1918, when the Ottoman Empire lost its territories in the Middle East following their defeat in World War I. Nevertheless, according to Professor Ernest Tucker, the treaty can be seen as the "culmination" of a process of normalisation between the two that had commenced with the Peace of Amasya. As opposed to any other Ottoman-Safavid treaty, Zuhab proved to be more "resilient" and became a "point of departure" for almost all further agreements on a diplomatic level between the two neighbors.

References

Sources
 
 
 
 
 Somel, Selçuk Akşin, Historical Dictionary of the Ottoman Empire, Scarecrow Press Inc., 2003.

Further reading

See also
 Safavid dynasty
 Ottoman Empire
 History of Iran
 History of Turkey
 History of the Caucasus
 Iran–Iraq War
 List of treaties
 Treaty of Gulistan
 Treaty of Turkmenchay

1639 in Asia
1639 in Europe
1639 in law
Zuhab
Zuhab
Zuhab
Iran–Turkey relations
Ottoman–Persian Wars
17th century in Iran
History of the Caucasus
Military history of Georgia (country)
Military history of Armenia
Military history of Iraq
History of Dagestan
1639 in the Ottoman Empire